Politics of the Republic of the Congo takes place in a framework of a unitary semi-presidential republic, whereby the President is the head of state and the Prime Minister is the head of government, of a pluriform multi-party system. Executive power is exercised by the President and the Government. Recently, following the approval of a new Constitution after a referendum in 2015, Congo became a semi-presidential republic after the creation of the post of prime minister who is responsible to the legislature, as well is the cabinet of the former. Legislative power is vested in both the Government and the two chambers of parliament.

Many countries have a semi-presential republic and elections, examples of other countries than the Republic of the Congo include France, Peru, and Croatia. However, having semi-presential republic does not necessarily mean that a country is a democracy. A central, but not the only, component of democracy is free and fair elections, where the population can hold accountable those in power. Data collected from Freedom House, shows that the country scored 2/40 on political rights, and 15/60 on civil liberties; however, more specifically, the country scored 0/4 on whether there were free and fair elections.

In terms of civil, political, and human rights, another tenant of democracy, another non-governmental organization, BTI, reports that the rule of law “only exists on paper” in the country; this follows suit from a report from Amnesty International, which documents how Alexandre Ibacka Dzabana and Ras le Bol, both human rights leaders in the country were arrested the day after they announced they would hold a press conference to denounce election irregularities that occurred.

Executive branch

|President
|Denis Sassou-Nguesso
|Party of Labour
|25 October 1997
|-
|Prime Minister
|Anatole Collinet Makosso
|Party of Labour
|12 May 2021
|}

Legislative branch
The Parliament (Parlement) has two chambers. The National Assembly (Assemblée Nationale) elects its members to five-year terms in single-seat constituencies. The members of the Senate (Sénat) are elected for a six-year term by district, local and regional councils. 
The Republic of Congo is a one party dominant state with the Congolese Labour Party in power. Opposition parties are allowed, but are widely considered to have no real chance of gaining power.

Political parties and elections

Presidential elections

Parliamentary elections

International organization participation
ACCT, 
ACP, 
AfDB, 
BDEAC, 
CCC, 
CEEAC, 
ECA, 
FAO, 
FZ, 
G-77, 
IBRD, 
ICAO, 
ICFTU, 
ICRM, 
IDA, 
IFAD, 
IFC, 
IFRCS, 
ILO, 
IMF, 
IMO, 
Intelsat, 
Interpol, 
IOC, 
IOM (observer), 
ITU, 
NAM, 
OAU, 
OPCW, 
UDEAC, 
UN (Security Council member for 2006/2007), 
UNCTAD, 
UNESCO, 
UNIDO, 
UPU, 
WFTU, 
WHO, 
WIPO, 
WMO, 
WToO, 
WTrO

References

External links